The 2021 UConn Huskies softball team represented the University of Connecticut in the 2021 NCAA Division I softball season. The Huskies were led by Laura Valentino in her 2nd year as head coach, and played as part of the Big East Conference after joining the conference for the 2020–21 academic year.  They play their home games at the newly rebuilt Connecticut Softball Stadium.  UConn finished with a final record of 22–20, and finished third in the Big East with a conference record of 12–9.  They reached the final of the Big East Tournament, but fell to Villanova.

Previous season
As with other teams, the Huskies' 2020 season was cut short by the COVID-19 pandemic during March.  UConn was off to a promising start, with a 16–5 record, the first time the Huskies finished with a winning record since 2009.  No conference games were played prior to the early cancellation of the season.

Personnel

Roster

Coaches

Schedule

References 

UConn
UConn Huskies softball seasons
UConn softball